Atlantoscia floridana is a species of woodlouse in the family Philosciidae. It is found in North America, Africa, and South America.

References

Woodlice
Articles created by Qbugbot
Crustaceans described in 1940